This is a list of speakers of the House of Representatives of Belize.

References

Lists of members of the House of Representatives (Belize)
Belize
List